Dumitru Braghiș (born 28 December 1957) is a Moldovan politician, diplomat and economist. He is the current Moldovan Ambassador to China and Vietnam, appointed in mid-2020. He was the Prime Minister of Moldova from 1999 until 2001. Then, he was a member of the Parliament of Moldova, where he represented the Party Alliance Our Moldova. He was chairman of the Party of Social Democracy and deputy in the Parliament of the Republic of Moldova (2005 – 2009).

Biography
Dumitru Braghiș was born on  December 28, 1957, in the village of Grătieşti, Chișinău municipality, in a family of peasants. In 1975, he finished a secondary school no. 1 in Chişinău and in 1980 he graduated Technical University, specialising in power engineering,  working as an engineer-constructor at the Tractor's Factory. He has Ph.D. in Economics. Through 1981 to 1992 he held various eligible positions in the Komsomol. In 1987 through 1988 he was an instructor in Central Committee of Communist Party of Moldova. Braghiș was elected as deputy in the Supreme Soviet of the Soviet Union in 1989 through 1991. Through 1992–1995 Braghiș became the General Deputy Director of "Moldova EXIM" Association. Through 1995–1997 Braghiș was the General Director of the Department for Foreign Economic relations of the Ministry of Finance.

In 1997, through 1999, Braghiș was the Deputy Minister of Economy and Reforms. Braghiș became the Prime Minister of Moldova in 1999 through April 2001. Since 2001 Braghiș has been a deputy in Parliament of the Republic of Moldova. In the 2005 parliamentary elections, he was elected as a deputy in the lists of the Electoral Bloc Democratic Moldova, becoming chairman of this party. In July 2005, he was an independent candidate for the Chisinau City Mayor's General Election, gaining 20.65% of the votes. Since 2006, he has served as the chairman of the Social Democratic Party. He has also run for election on June 3, 2007, from the Party of Social Democracy of Moldova (PSDM). After the expiration of his mandate of deputy in 2009, until 2013 he worked in the private sector. On 27 November 2015, he became the Extraordinary and Plenipotentiary Ambassador of the Republic of Moldova to the Russian Federation. He was dismissed from this role in early 2017.

Dumitru Braghis speaks English, French and Russian. He is married and has a child.

See also 
 Chișinău election, 2005

References

https://china.mfa.gov.md/ro/content/ambasador

External links
Dumitru BRAGHIŞ

1957 births
Living people
Politicians from Chișinău
Prime Ministers of Moldova
Members of the parliament of Moldova
20th-century Moldovan economists
Moldovan MPs 2005–2009
Moldovan MPs 2001–2005
Social Democratic Party (Moldova) politicians
Yugoslav economists